Bill Tudor (September 17, 1921 – March 23, 1996) was an American businessman who founded the food chain Tudor's Biscuit World in Charleston, West Virginia, in 1980.

Personal life
He was born in Clendenin, West Virginia, to Mary Banks Tudor (born 1893) and Joseph Henry Tudor (born 1891) in 1921. His brother's name is Josiah (born 1919).

Business career
He worked at a gas stop in Bolt, West Virginia, until 1944, when he married Mae Anderson.  He then worked at a diner in Charleston, West Virginia, until 1977. Two years later, he and his wife bought a building for $63,000.  A year later they turned it into a restaurant.  In November 1980, they named the restaurant Tudor's Biscuit World.

1921 births
1996 deaths
Businesspeople from Charleston, West Virginia
People from Clendenin, West Virginia
People from Raleigh County, West Virginia